PAG is a global investment firm that manages multiple asset classes, including private equity, private debt, real estate and hedge funds. It is considered one of the largest private investment firms in Asia.

History 
PAG’s Credit & Markets business evolved from Pacific Alliance Group, co-founded by Chris Gradel and Horst Geicke in 2002 as a multi-strategy hedge fund manager.

The Real Assets business grew out of Secured Capital Japan, co-founded in 1997 by Jon-Paul Toppino, a pioneer in real estate and distressed asset investing in the Japan market.

Weijian Shan founded the Private Equity business in 2010 after a successful career leading deals for private equity firms TPG and Newbridge Capital.

In the same year, Gradel, Shan and Toppino brought their respective successful strategies together under the PAG brand.

In 2011 the firm rebranded from Pacific Alliance Group to PAG.

In March 2018, the Blackstone Group acquired a minority stake in PAG.

In 2019, PAG formed Polymer Capital Management, a long/short equity hedge fund.

In 2021, PAG launched FLOW Digital Infrastructure, the firm’s new regional platform to capitalize on the rapidly growing demand for digital infrastructure in the Asia Pacific region.

In 2022, PAG launched PAG Renewables, a wholly owned company with the mandate to develop, build, operate, and invest in renewable energy in Asia.

In January 2022, there was speculation that PAG planned to hold an initial public offering (IPO) in Hong Kong. In March, PAG filed for an IPO aiming to raise $2 billion.

Business overview 
PAG has offices in Hong Kong, Tokyo, Shanghai, Singapore, Sydney, Beijing, Seoul, Taipei, Melbourne and Mumbai.

PAG has three main strategies, namely Private Equity, Real Assets and Credit & Markets.

Private Equity

Real Assets

Credit & Markets

Notable Investments 
 
 Craveable Brands
 Cushman & Wakefield
 Edelweiss Wealth Management 
 Joyson Safety Systems
 Lexmark
 Pacific Century Place Marunouchi
 Paradise Group Holdings
 Patties Foods
 Rex Airlines 
 Tencent Music Entertainment Group
 Universal Studios Japan
 UGL Limited

Notable Deals 
On 13 December 2013, PAG invested $250 million into theme park operator Universal Studios Japan. Other investors in the deal included Goldman Sachs, MBK Partners and Owl Creek.

In 2013, PAG invested $137 million in China Music Corporation (CMC), a predecessor entity of Tencent Music Entertainment (TME). As CMC’s largest shareholder, PAG’s investment catalysed the roll-up of various digital music properties to form the then largest music streaming business in China. TME was listed on the NYSE in 2018. PAG eventually realized total exit proceeds of US$2.607 billion.

On 16 June 2014, TPG Capital, PAG and Ontario Teachers’ Pension Plan acquired DTZ from UGL Limited for an enterprise value of US$1.215 billion. On 11 May 2015, DTZ merged with Cushman & Wakefield in a $2 billion deal. On 2 August 2018, Cushman & Wakefield held an IPO and was listed on the New York Stock Exchange under the symbol “CWK”.

On 27 June 2014, PAG acquired Commerzbank's Real Estate subsidiary in Japan including a EUR700 million ($954 million) Japanese mezzanine property loan portfolio.

On 21 October 2014, PAG's Secured Capital announced sale of Pacific Century Place Marunouchi in Japan to Singapore's sovereign wealth fund, GIC for US$1.7 billion (S$2.2 billion).

On 5 January 2016, Chinese milk firm Yili Group sold all its remaining right on China Youran Dairy Group to Yogurt Holding I (HK) Limited, a subsidiary of PAG.

On 20 April 2016, Apex Technology and PAG acquired Lexmark for US$3.6 billion.

On 2017, PAG acquired Yingde Gasses, largest independent industrial gases producer in China.

On 11 April 2018, PAG and Joyson Electronics funded Key Safety Systems to successfully complete the acquisition of Air-Bag Maker, Takata for $1.588 billion. The combined company was rebranded Joyson Safety Systems.

On 12 July 2019, PAG acquired Craveable Brands from Archer Capital for $450m.

On 27 August 2020, PAG acquired a 51% stake in Edelweiss Wealth Management (EWM), the second largest non-bank wealth management business in India for US$300 million (INR 22 billion).

On 19 November 2020, PAG signed an agreement to invest up to AUD150 million in Regional Express Airlines (REX) to support the launch of Rex's domestic jet operations scheduled to commence on 1 March 2021.

In April 2021, PAG completed the acquisition of the major franchise platforms of % ΔRΔBICΔ, one of the world’s fastest-growing coffee and lifestyle brands, giving the PAG-controlled entities exclusive franchise rights in more than ten countries and regions including Mainland China, Hong Kong, Macau, Singapore, Malaysia, Thailand, Canada, India, Spain, and Russia.

In April 2021, PAG was merging Yingde Gases Group with Shanghai Baosteel Group, in preparation for a $10 billion offshore IPO. During the same month, PAG and Aspex invested $60 million in Adrian Cheng's SPAC Artisan Acquisition.

In November 2021, PAG announced the acquisition of Japan-based restaurant operator GYRO HOLDINGS Co., Ltd to support its growth strategy. GYRO operates over 90 brands with a focus on its core themed izakaya concepts.

In March 2022, PAG finalized the acquisition of Unispace, a company known for revolutionising the creation of workplace with an integrated approach to office strategy, design and construction.

In August 2022, PAG announced it has entered into an agreement with H.I.S. Co., Ltd. to acquire Huis Ten Bosch, one of Japan’s largest theme parks, for an equity valuation of approximately JPY100 Billion. 

In September 2022, PAG entered into agreements to acquire Patties Foods and Vesco Foods, two leading Australian companies in the food and consumer sector.

References

External links 
 
 www.polymercapital.com (Polymer Capital Website)

Alternative investment management companies
Private equity firms of Asia-Pacific